Merkin Hall is a 449-seat concert hall in Manhattan, New York City.  The hall, named in honor of Hermann and Ursula Merkin, is part of the Kaufman Music Center, a complex that includes the Lucy Moses School, a community arts school, and the Special Music School (P.S. 859), a New York City public school for musically gifted children.  Merkin Hall hosts 70,000 concertgoers a year.

Overview
Merkin Hall opened in Kaufman Music Center's (then The Hebrew Art School's) Abraham Goodman House in 1978, and soon after distinguished itself as an important New York City venue, featuring innovative classical and new music programming (it is the recipient of three awards in Adventurous Programming by ASCAP/Chamber Music America). Located in the Lincoln Square neighborhood, it is near the Lincoln Center campus but is not affiliated with it. Merkin Hall hosts over 200 concerts a year, many of them Kaufman Music Center presentations. It has several long-running series, presenting established and emerging artists, as well as Broadway and Family focused shows. Beginning in 1986, Kaufman Music Center has co-presented New Sounds Live with WNYC, hosted by John Schaefer and broadcast live on the radio. In 2003, New York Festival of Song began its series of co-presentations at Merkin Hall as well. WQXR-FM's online webcast Q2 began live streaming of Kaufman Music Center's Ecstatic Music Festival in 2011.

Renovations
Kaufman Music Center launched a $17 million campaign to renovate the complex. The lead donors were Elaine and Henry Kaufman, who pledged $7 million towards the project.  Elaine Kaufman has been a member of the center's board for more than twenty years, and served as its chairman from 1999 to 2005.  She said, “The Center is a unique organization, placing equal emphasis on education and performance, an essential balance for developing the artists and audiences of the future.”

Renovations included restoration of the building façade using contemporary materials and redesign of the main entrance; expanded space for music classes, special events, and theater workshops, including two new classrooms and a flexible balcony educational space; enhanced audio-visual capabilities in Merkin Hall, including updated listening systems for hearing-impaired concert goers and students; structural and mechanical improvements, including the installation of a new HVAC system; reupholstered seating and minor refinishing in Merkin Hall; renovation and expansion of restrooms; expansion of lobby space to serve the two schools; and the redesign of Merkin Hall lobby. The renovation respects the building's original form while enhancing its functionality and appearance.

The goals of the renovation were portrayed in theatrical terms: “At a performance venue, the show should begin on the sidewalk.  We’re going to have a welcoming new canopy over the street entrance, with the Kaufman name on it big enough to be visible from both Broadway and Amsterdam Avenue.  We will transform the arrival experience and brighten it up with vivid   fire-red marble—everything from coat-checking to buying your refreshments to finding your seat will take place in a more glamorous setting, so that Merkin Hall and the Kaufman Center can become more indelibly stamped on the New York mind than ever before.”

References

External links

Merkin Hall

Music venues in Manhattan
Merkin family
Lincoln Square, Manhattan